Lee Jun-ho is a Korean name consisting of the family name Lee and the given name Jun-ho (Joon-ho). It may refer to:

 Lee Jun-ho (footballer) (born 1989), South Korean footballer
 Lee Jun-ho (entertainer) (born 1990), South Korean singer
 Lee Joon-ho (speed skater) (born 1965), South Korean short track speed skater
 Lee Jun-ho (gymnast) (born 1995), South Korean artistic gymnast

See also 
Lee Jung-hoo (born 1998), South Korean baseball player

Lee Jun-ho, character from Extraordinary Attorney Woo.